In Romania some of the magazines are published by international companies such as Egmont and Axel Springer Verlag. In the country some international magazines in addition to national ones are also published, including Forbes Romania, GEO magazine and National Geographic Kids.

The following is an incomplete list of current and defunct magazines published in Romania. It also covers those magazines before the independence of the country. They may be published in Romanian language or in other languages.

A

 Academia Cațavencu
 Albina Românească
 Angelicuss
 Apostrof
 The Attic

B
 Bilete de Papagal
 Bravo

C

 Capital
 Colecția de Povestiri Științifico-Fantastice
 Contemporanul
 Contimporanul
 Convorbiri Literare
 Cuvântul
 Cuvântul Liber
 Cybersecurity Trends
 Cronica Veche

D
 Dacia Literară
 Digital Trends
 Dilema veche

F

 Familia
 Făt Frumos
   Femeia
 Flacăra
 Florile Dalbe
 Formula AS

G
 Gândirea
 George Lazăr
 Graiul Nostru

I
 Ioana
 IT Trends

J
 J'Adore

L
 Luceafărul
 Lucire
 Lucru de mână

M
 Magazin Istoric
 Media Expres
 Mișcarea Literară
 MyLINUX

O
 Observator Cultural

P
 Paloda
 Practic in bucatarie
 Punct

R

 Realitatea Evreiască
 Repere Transilvane
 Revista 22
 Revista Fundațiilor Regale
 România Literară

S

 Sămănătorul
 Șapte Seri
 Sburătorul
 Scrisul Nostru
 Semănătorul
 Sfera Politicii
 Simbolul
 Steaua Dunării
 Switch

T
 Timpul

U
 Unitárius Hírnök
 unu

V

 Vatra
 Versuri și Proză
 Viața Basarabiei
 Viața Basarabiei (1907)
 Viața Medicală
 Viața Românească

See also
List of newspapers in Romania

References

Romania
Lists of mass media in Romania